Madlauda is a township near Panipat City of Panipat district of Haryana, India. Population of this town is approximately 15,000 as per reports in 2019.

Madlauda acts as a junction between the rail and road tracks connecting Rajasthan with Haryana via Jind. The railway station of Madlauda was built in early 1800 by East India Company to transport goods across the state. Electric trains connect to Jind and Panipat in each direction and  borders approximately 50 small villages making it a main connecting point for these villages to big cities like Panipat

Notable people

 Krishan Lal Panwar - Minister of transport in Government of Haryana

References 

Panipat district